Louis Johnson (April 13, 1955 – May 21, 2015) was an American bass guitarist. Johnson was best known for his work with the group the Brothers Johnson and his session playing on several hit albums of the 1970s and 1980s, including the best-selling album of all time, Michael Jackson's Thriller.

His signature sound came from the Music Man StingRay bass guitar, which Leo Fender made for him, and from his slapping technique. He is ranked number 38 on Bass Player magazine's list of "the 100 Greatest Bass Players of All Time".

Biography
His work appears on many well-known records by prominent artists. Johnson played on Michael Jackson's albums Off the Wall, Thriller and Dangerous, and hit songs "Billie Jean" and "Don't Stop 'Til You Get Enough". He also played on George Benson's Give Me the Night. He was one of three bassists on Herb Alpert's 1979 album Rise, which included its top-10, Grammy-winning disco/jazz title-track. Due to his distinctive style, Johnson was nicknamed "Thunder-Thumbs". His slap bass playing arrived soon after Larry Graham brought it into the mainstream, and both are considered the "grandfathers" of slap-bass playing.

His slap bass lines figure prominently in his work with Stanley Clarke on the Time Exposure album, his work with Grover Washington, Jr. (Hydra), George Duke (Guardian of the Light, Thief in the Night), Jeffrey Osborne (Jeffrey Osborne, and Stay with Me Tonight). The bass line for Michael McDonald's "I Keep Forgettin' (Every Time You're Near)" has been sampled as a backing track for dozens of rap songs. An excellent example of his thumb playing can be heard on the Earl Klugh song "Kiko". Without any plucking at all, Johnson sets a complicated funky bass line using a combination of counterpoint slapping with right hand using right thumb, counterpoint with left hand middle finger as a mute technique, called a slap choke, thus creating a percussive sound like drums, adding to the bass notes. His style incorporated more funk plucks in combination with his thumping, which along with the Music Man StingRay sound gives a very funky, unique sound. He was the bassist on Earl Klugh's 1976 jazz/pop album Living inside Your Love and 1977 jazz/pop album Finger Paintings, as well as Quincy Jones' 1975 Mellow Madness.

Johnson also worked with Andrae Crouch, Angela Bofill, Anita Baker, Aretha Franklin, Billy Preston, Bill Withers, Björk, the Controllers, the Crusaders, Dave Grusin, David Diggs, Deniece Williams, Donna Summer, Donn Thomas, Gábor Szabó,  Gene Van Buren,  Harvey Mason, Herbie Hancock, Hiroshima, Irene Cara, the Jacksons, James Ingram, John Mellencamp, Karen Carpenter, Kent Jordan, Kenny Loggins, Lee Ritenour, Leon Haywood, Lesley Gore, Makoto Izumitani, Natalie Cole, Patti Austin, Paul McCartney, Peabo Bryson, Peggy Lee, Phil Collins, Pointer Sisters, Randy Badazz, Rene & Angela, the Ritz, Rufus, Sérgio Mendes, Side Effect, Sister Sledge, Stevie Nicks, Stevie Wonder, Sweet Comfort Band, Temptations, George Duke, Toshiki Kadomatsu and The Supremes.

Death
Louis Johnson died on May 21, 2015, at the age of 60. The cause of death was gastrointestinal bleeding of the esophagus.

Solo releases

Collaborations
With Aretha Franklin
 Aretha (Arista Records, 1980)
 Love All the Hurt Away (Arista Records, 1981)
 Jump to It (Arista Records, 1982)
 Who's Zoomin' Who? (Arista Records, 1985)
 Through the Storm (Arista Records, 1989)

With Billy Preston
 Music Is My Life (A&M Records, 1972)
 Pressin' On (Motown, 1982)

With Deniece Williams
 I'm So Proud (Columbia Records, 1983)

With George Benson
 Give Me the Night (Warner Bros. Records, 1980)

With Michael McDonald
 If That's What It Takes (Warner Bros. Records, 1982)

With Peabo Bryson
 Straight from the Heart (Elektra Records, 1984)

With John Mellencamp
 Uh-huh (Riva Records, 1983)

With Barbra Streisand
 Till I Loved You (CBS Records, 1988)

With Jeffrey Osborne
 Jeffrey Osborne (A&M Records, 1982)
 Stay with Me Tonight (A&M Records, 1983)
 Don't Stop (A&M Records, 1984)

With Betty Wright
 Wright Back At You (Epic Records, 1983)

With Michael Jackson
 Off the Wall (Epic Records, 1979)
 Thriller (Epic Records, 1982)
 Dangerous (Epic Records, 1991)

With Irene Cara
 Carasmatic (Elektra Records, 1987)

With Patti Austin
 Every Home Should Have One (Qwest Records, 1981)

With Bill Withers
 Making Music (Columbia Records, 1975)

With Donna Summer
 Donna Summer (Geffen, 1982)

References

1955 births
2015 deaths
A&M Records artists
African-American guitarists
American double-bassists
Male double-bassists
American jazz bass guitarists
American funk bass guitarists
American male bass guitarists
American rhythm and blues bass guitarists
Deaths from gastrointestinal hemorrhage
American session musicians
Grammy Award winners
Guitarists from Los Angeles
Burials at Rose Hills Memorial Park
20th-century American bass guitarists
Jazz musicians from California
20th-century American male musicians
American male jazz musicians
20th-century African-American musicians
21st-century African-American people